The Greater Toronto and Hamilton Area (GTHA) is a contiguous urban region that is composed of some of the largest cities and metropolitan areas by population in the Canadian province of Ontario. The GTHA consists of the Greater Toronto Area (GTA) and the city of Hamilton. The GTA is Canada’s most populous metropolitan area that includes the city of Toronto and the regional municipalities of Halton, Peel, York, and Durham. The GTHA forms the core of a larger urban agglomeration known as the Golden Horseshoe.

Beginning in the late-2000s, the term "Greater Toronto and Hamilton Area" was introduced by a few public bodies to refer to the GTA and the city of Hamilton as a single entity. The population of the combined area is 7,281,694 as of 2021, and is projected to grow to 8.6 million by 2031. The main  series of roadways that connects all the areas together (going from Durham to Hamilton) includes highways 401, 427, 403, and the Queen Elizabeth Way. The GTHA has regional public transport served by GO Transit and local service by multiple agencies, which mostly use the Presto card as fare payment.

Municipalities and populations

See also

 Golden Horseshoe
 Great Lakes Megalopolis
 Metrolinx mobility hubs

Footnotes

References

Geographic regions of Ontario
Metropolitan areas of Ontario